The 1979 Niger State gubernatorial election occurred on July 28, 1979. NPN's Awwal Ibrahim won election for a first term to become Niger State's first executive governor leading and, defeating main opposition in the contest.

Awwal Ibrahim emerged winner in the NPN gubernatorial primary election. His running mate was Idris Alhassan Kpaki.

Electoral system
The Governor of Niger State is elected using the plurality voting system.

Results
There were five political parties registered by the Federal Electoral Commission (FEDECO) to participate in the election. Malam Awwal Ibrahim of the NPN won the contest by polling the highest votes.

References 

Niger State gubernatorial elections
Niger State gubernatorial election
Niger